Mi Verdad may refer to one of the following:
Mi Verdad (album), 1999 album by Alejandro Fernández
"Mi Verdad" (song), 2015 song by Maná